Horace Albert "Bones" McKinney (January 1, 1919 – May 16, 1997) was an American professional basketball player and coach.

A 6'6" small forward who played at both North Carolina State University (2 seasons) and the University of North Carolina (1 season, after U.S. Army service during World War II interrupted his college career), McKinney had a six-year playing career in the NBA, most of them with the now-defunct Washington Capitols. He also played for the Boston Celtics. His final year with the Capitols (in the 1950–51 season), McKinney was a player-coach; the team folded midway through the season.

McKinney, known for his sideline antics, would later coach the Wake Forest University Demon Deacons, leading them to two Atlantic Coast Conference titles and an appearance in the Final Four in 1962.

McKinney also coached Carolina Cougars of the American Basketball Association from 1969 through 1971. He coached them to a 42–42 record during the 1969–70 season, good for third place in the East Division. The Cougars then lost in the first round of the 1970 ABA playoffs to the Indiana Pacers, 4 games to 0.  As the 1970–71 season got under way, McKinney was named a vice president of the team.  After a 17–25 start, halfway through the season McKinney was replaced as head coach by his assistant coach Jerry Steele.  Steele also went 17-25 for the remainder of the season for a 34–50 record that failed to get the Cougars into the 1971 ABA playoffs.  During the 1970–71 season, McKinney provided color commentary for the television broadcast of the 1971 ABA All Star Game. Subsequently, McKinney would have a long and successful career as a color analyst for television broadcasts of ACC basketball games.

McKinney's picture hangs in the North Carolina History Museum's North Carolina Sports Hall of Fame and one of his basketball jerseys is also displayed there. He was also a graduate of Southeastern Baptist Theological Seminary and an ordained minister of the Southern Baptist Convention.

BAA/NBA career statistics

Regular season

Playoffs

Head coaching record

College

See also
 List of NCAA Division I Men's Final Four appearances by coach

References

External links
BasketballReference.com: Bones McKinney (as coach)
BasketballReference.com: Bones McKinney (as player)

1919 births
1997 deaths
20th-century Christians
American Basketball Association announcers
American Basketball Association executives
American men's basketball coaches
American men's basketball players
Baptists from North Carolina
Basketball coaches from North Carolina
Basketball players from North Carolina
Boston Celtics players
Carolina Cougars coaches
NC State Wolfpack men's basketball players
North Carolina Tar Heels men's basketball players
People from Pamlico County, North Carolina
Player-coaches
Small forwards
Southern Baptist ministers
Wake Forest Demon Deacons men's basketball coaches
Washington Capitols coaches
Washington Capitols players
20th-century Baptist ministers from the United States